Scophthalmus maeoticus (Black Sea turbot or kalkan) is a fish species in the family Scophthalmidae. It is widespread in the Black Sea. It is sometimes treated as a subspecies of the turbot, Scophthalmus maximus, which is common in the Mediterranean Sea. The taxonomic status of this species is under discussion. It is an important commercial species.

References

External links
 

maeoticus
Commercial fish
Fish of the Black Sea
Fish described in 1814
Taxa named by Peter Simon Pallas